Ride & Show Engineering, Inc. is an American private company that conceptualizes, develops, and builds attractions, show action equipment, and transportation systems. In 1984 Eduard Feuer and William Watkins, the former Senior Project Engineer and Chief Mechanical Engineer, respectively, for Walt Disney Imagineering, established Ride & Show in the state of California.

Ride & Show designs, engineers and fabricates simulation and motion base systems, boat ride systems, and people movers; floor-mounted ride systems for dark ride attractions; monorails; and numerous show action and special effect equipment for large and small entertainment projects worldwide.

Industries 
Ride & Show's clientele extend beyond typical amusement parks and range into:
 Retail and location-based entertainment
 Theme park attractions
 Transportation and ride systems
 Large show equipment and stages
 Science centers and museums

Projects 
Ride & Show's first project was to redesign and rehabilitate the chassis and install new bodies for the Disneyland Mark V monorails for Messerchmitt-Bölkow-Blohm (MBB) of Germany.  Shortly thereafter Disney contracted Ride & Show to design and supply the Maelstrom boat ride system for the Norway Pavilion attraction at Epcot.

The company has created and developed a number entertainment and specialty projects in a variety of forms.

Completed entertainment projects

Completed performance stage projects

Completed specialized engineering projects

Patents
Ride & Show Engineering has been assigned four patents in the entertainment industry.
 Amusement ride car system with multiple axis rotation, which pairs ride car systems with programmable controllers to direct patrons view of the show sets and scenery within an attraction.  The invention was a significant improvement over previous mechanical cam systems utilized to achieve this result.  
 Flight simulator which provides for independent control of rotation about the pitch and roll axis including the capability for complete inversion of an occupant in the cockpit.
 Flight simulator with full 360 degree rotation capability about the roll axis.
 Inverted simulation attraction where the ride cars are suspended from the track and the cars are pointed in various directions to view specific portions of the attraction and a motion base allows for simulated movement

References

Sources 

 McNARY, Dave (July 26, 1987). "Fantasies make San Dimas firm boom". Tribune/News. p. H1
 McNARY, Dave (July 26, 1987). "Disneyland monorails getting a major facelift". Tribune/News. p. H1
 Parisi, Paula (November 18, 1993). "IAAPA event a thrill a minute". The Hollywood Reporter. 
 Dreyer, Evan (December 20, 1993). "Theme Park in Oceanside considered". The North County Times. p. A-1
 Shaer, Ruth (April 1999). "San Dimas Engineering Company Specializes in Theme Attractions". San Gabriel Valley Business Journal. p. 1, 3, 4
 Benson, Don and Drummer, Randyl (May 15, 2000). "Inland Empire Focus:  Exporters win honors for globalizing trade". The Business Press/California. 
 Luna, Rene (October 11, 2000). "Design firm has some magic of its own". Inland Valley Times. p. 2
 Bradvica, David (May 20, 2002). "Cardinal Mahony blesses doors for L.A. cathedral". Inland Valley Daily Bulletin. p. A3
 Miles, Jack (2002). "The Great Bronze Doors for the Cathedral of Our Lady of the Angels". Wave Publishing. p. 108-125

Amusement ride manufacturers
Entertainment companies based in California
Manufacturing companies based in California
Companies based in Los Angeles County, California
San Dimas, California
American companies established in 1984
Construction and civil engineering companies established in 1984
Manufacturing companies established in 1984
1984 establishments in California